Anthony Jones may refer to:

Music
 Anthony "Sooty" Jones (1949–1985), American rock bass guitarist with the English band Humble Pie
 Anthony Linden Jones (born 1959), Australian composer, conductor, and performer
 Anthony M. Jones (born 1982), American pop record producer and songwriter for EMI Music Publishing
 Anthony Armstrong Jones (1949–1996), American country music singer

Sports
 Anthony Jones (American football) (born 1960), American football player
 Tiger Jones (American football) (Anthony Keith Jones, born 1982), American arena football player
 Anthony Jones (Australian rules footballer) (born 1974), Australian footballer
 Anthony Windham Jones (1879–1959), Welsh rugby player
 Anthony Jones (athlete) (born 1955), Barbadian Olympic sprinter
 Anthony Jones (basketball, born 1962), American professional basketball player
 Anthony Jones (basketball, born 1967), American basketball player

Other
 Anthony Jones (photographer) (born 1962), British photographer
 Van Jones (Anthony Kapel Jones, born 1968), American environmental advocate, civil rights activist, attorney, and former aide to Barack Obama
 Anthony Jones (technologist), New Orleans post-Katrina city director of management information services
 Anthony R. Jones (born 1948), U.S. Army general
 Anthony Jones (priest) (died 1678), Welsh Anglican priest
 Skeery Jones, American radio host

See also
 Antony Armstrong-Jones, 1st Earl of Snowdon (1930–2017), photographer, film-maker and life peer
 Anthony Whitworth-Jones (born 1945), opera director
 Tony Jones (disambiguation)